Jayabharathi is an Indian actress. She is a two-time recipient of the Kerala State Film Award for best actress.

Jayabharathi's first leading role was given by director P. Bhaskaran for his movie Kattukurangu in 1969. Later she became one of the most successful Malayalam film actresses and performed with such notable leading men as Prem Nazir, Madhu, Vincent, Jayan, M. G. Soman, Kamal Haasan and Rajinikanth. Jayabharathi-MG Soman was a popular on-screen pair of the 1970s and early 1980s. She won the Kerala State Film Awards for her performances in various films in 1972 and Madhavikutty in 1973. One of her famous films was Rathinirvedam, directed by Bharathan, in which she played a woman who fell in love with a boy younger than her. 
Rathinirvedam is regarded as a landmark in Indian film history. It is one of the most sensuous movies of all time, and is said to have redefined the art of movie making in South India. The extremely erotic scenes performed by Jayabharathi sent heat waves across Kerala. Even when some of the intelligentsia predicted the beginning of a new era of parallel cinema, a major section of Malayalis were on the warpath saying that mainstream Malayalam cinema had degenerated to porn. But in spite of the criticism, Rathinirvedam became one of the biggest box office hits in Kerala's history.  It inspires similar productions all over South India, even decades after its release.

After being trained since the age of five under Kalamandalam Natarajan, Rajaram (a student of Vazhuvoor Ramaiah Pillai) and Vazhuvoor Samraj Pillai, Jayabharathi entered films as a teenager. Life revolved around film studios, dance rehearsals and stage performances. The actress is busy these days with her dance school Aswathi Arts Academy, which she runs from home. She is also starting another one in Coimbatore. In 2003, Jayabharathi performed in nine temples in and around Kerala.

Personal life

She was born to Malayali parents as Lakshmi Bharathi, to Shivasankaran Pillai and sharada. Malayalam actor Jayan was her first cousin.

She married actor Sathaar in 1979 and They have a son Krish J. Sathaar (Unnikrishnan), born in 1984.

Awards and honours

Filmography

Malayalam

Onnaman  (2002)
Nakshatragal Parayathirunnathu  (2001)
Ezhupunna Tharakan (1999) as Aswathi's aunt
Sooryaputhran (1998) as Hema's mother 
Man of the Match (1996) as Suhra
Vishnu (1994) as Advocate Padmaja Menon
Kanyakumariyil Oru Kavitha  (1993) as Sathyabhama
Ootty Pattanam (1992) as Lakshmi
Vembanad (1991)
No.20 Madras Mail (1990) as Geetha
Nammude Naadu (1990) as Lakshmi
Aalasyam (1990)
Veena Meettiya Vilangukal (1990)
Adharvam (1989) as Malu
Dasharatham (1989) as Dr. Zeenat
Dhwani (1988) as Malathi
Witness (1988) as Dr. Sridevi
Moonam Pakkam (1988) as Pachu's mother
Ambalakkara Panjayath  (1988)
January Oru Orma (1987) as Padmavathi
Manja Mantharangal (1987) as Sarah Thomas
Idanazhiyil Oru Kalocha  (1987) as Parvathy
Aval Kaathirunnu Avanum  (1986)
Kanathaya Penkutty (1985) as Bharathi
Madhuvidhu Theerum Munbe (1985)
Sandhya Mayangum Neram (1983) as Yasodha
Prashnam Gurutharam (1983) as Dr. Sujatha
Mahabali (1983)
Thavalam  (1983) as Meenakshi
Swapname Ninakku Nandi (1983) as Nabeesa
Njanonnu Parayatte(1982) as Bhargavi
Nagamadathu Thamburatti  (1982) as Sathi Thampuratti
Jambulingam  (1982)
Theeram Thedunna Thira  (1982)
Adarsham (1982)
Thuranna Jail  (1982) as Thulasi
Niram Marunna Nimishangal  (1982)
Ariyappedatha Rahasyam (1981) as Geetha
Attimari (1981) as Lakshmi
Agni Yudham (1981)
Agnisaram (1981)
Kodumudikal (1981) as Sunantha
Theekkali (1981) as Geetha
Arikkari Ammu (1981)
Aakkramanam (1981)
Choothattam  (1981)
Pathirasooryan  (1981) as Rajani
Swarnagal Swapnagal  (1981) as Indira
Ira Thedunna Manushyar  (1981)
Itha Oru Dhikkari(1981) as Ramani
Ithikkara Pakki (1980) as 
Karipurandajeevithangal (1980) as Savithri
Kadalkattu (1980) .
Chandrahasam (1980) as Rama
Chandra Bimbam (1980) as Rathi
Palattu Kunjikannan (1980) as Aryamala
Ammayum Makalum (1980) as Bharathi
Eden Thottam  (1980) as Shantha
Ival Ee Vazhi Ithu Vare (1980)
Pralayam(1980) as Malathi 
Oru Varsham Oru Masam  (1980)
Thirayum Theeravum  (1980)
Akalagalil Abhayam  (1980)
Puthiya Velicham (1979) as Lilly
Mochanam (1979) 
Sayoojyam(1979) as Rama
Irumbazhikal (1979) as Maya
Itha Oru Theeram (1979) as Sudha
Kayalum Kayarum (1979) as Jaanu
Manasa Vacha Karmana (1979) 
Indradhanusu  (1979) as Sindhu
College Beauty  (1979)
Ishtapraneshwari  (1979)
Ormayil Nee Mathram  (1979)
Anubhavangale Nandi  (1979)
Ivide Kattinu Sugantham  (1979) as Indu
Kalam Kaathuninnilla  (1979)
Sugathinu Pinnale  (1979) ...Rajani
Rakthamillatha Manushyan (1979)....Rukmini
Pennorumbettaal (1979)
Chuvanna Chirakukal  (1979)
Ival Oru Nadodi  (1979)
Vellayani Paramu  (1979) as Lakshmikutty
Kathirmandapam  (1979)
Kannukal (1979) as Jalaja
Upasana  (1979)
Kaliyankattu Neeli (1979)
Allauddinum Albhutha Vilakkum  (1979) as Roshini
Rathi Nirvedam (1978) as Rathi
Asthamayam (1978) as Prabha
Ankakkuri (1979) as Geetha
Hemantharathri  (1978)
Avakasham  (1978)
Itha Oru Manushyan(1978) as Ammini 
Njan Njan Matram (1978) 
Vadakakku Oru Hridayam (1978) as Aswathi
Ee Manohara Theeram (1978) as Sarada 
Jayikkanayi Janichavan (1978)
Kalpavrisham (1978) as Radhika, Rani (double role)
Kaathirunna Nimisham (1978) as Ramani, Devi (double role)
Premashilpi  (1978) as Bharathi
Prarthana (1978)
Mudramothiram  (1978) as Rani
Mannu (1978)
Mattoly  (1978)
Mattoru Karnan  (1978)
Arum Anyaralla  (1978) as Gracy
Midukki Ponnamma  (1978)
Kadathanattu Makkam  (1978)
Balapareekshanam (1978)
Aval Vishvasthyayirunnu (1978) as Padmini
Rathinirvedam (1978) 
Ashtamudikayal (1978) 
Padmatheertham (1978) as Malini
Beena (1978) as Beena
Theerangal  (1978)
Lisa  (1978) as Herself
Seemandini  (1978)
Kanyaka (1978)....Malathi
Orkkuka Vellappozhum  (1978)
Adimakachavadam (1978)
Avar Jeevikkunnu  (1978)
Velluvili (1978).... Lakshmi
Snehathinte Mukhangal  (1978)
Sundarimarude Swapnagal (1978)
Kanalkattakal  (1978) .... Rajani
Nakshathragale Kaval  (1978)
Rowdy Ramu (1978)
Aarum Anyaralla (1978) as Gracy
Guruvayoor Kesavan (1977)
Kannapanunni (1977) as Kunjudevi
Randu Lokam (1977) as Radha
Itha Ivide Vare(1977) as Ammini
Aparadhi (1977) as Lissy
Anugraham  (1977) as Jyothi
Samudram  (1977) as Shobana
Panchamridam  (1977)
Aval Oru Devalayam  (1977)
Kavilamma (1977)
Ammayi Amma  (1977)
Manasoru Mayil (1977)
Hridayame Sakshi  (1977)
Thuruppu Gulan  (1977)
Karnaparvam  (1977)
Rathimanmadhan (1977)
Sukradasa  (1977)
Lakshmi  (1977)
Varadhakshina  (1977)
Tholkkan Enikku Manassilla (1977)
Aparajitha  (1977)
Yudhakandam  (1977)
Pallavi  (1977)
Allahu Akbar  (1977)
Rajaparambara  (1977)
Bharyavijayam  (1977)
Makam Piranna Manka  (1977)
Sreemad Bagavadgeetha  (1977)
Ayalkkari (1976) as Geetha
Panchami (1976) aa Panchami
Kamadhenu(1976) as Lakshmi
Prasadam (1976) as Sumathi
Light House (1976) as Geetha
Themmadi Velappan (1976) as Sindhu
Appoppan (1976) as Bindu
Agnipushpam (1976)
Sujatha (1976)
Anubhavam(1976)
Sindooram (1976)
Ammini Ammavan (1976)
Seemanda Puthran  (1976)
Abhinandanam  (1976)
Vazhivilakku  (1976)
Ozhukkinethire  (1976)
Rajankanam  (1976)
Manasaveena (1976)
Rajayogam (1976)
Pushpasharam (1976)
Nee Ente Lahari (1976)
Chennay Valarthiya Kutty (1976)
Kayamkulam Kochunniyude Makan (1976)
Rathriyile Yathrakkar (1976)
Sexilla Stundilla (1976)
Babu Mon (1975) as Indumathi
Cheenavala(1975) as Pennal
Chumaduthangi  (1975)
Kalyana Sougadhikam (1975)
Pulivalu (1975)
Makkal (1975)
Love Marriage (1975) as Manju
Alibabayum 41 Kallanmarum (1975) as Margiyana
Palazhi Madanam  (1975)
Padmaraagam (1975)
Dharmakshethre Kurushethre (1975)
Sooryavamsham (1975)
Kottaram Vilkkanundu (1975)
Priye Ninakku Vendi (1975)
Hello Darling (1975)....Syamala
Chief Guest (1975)
Thamarathoni (1975)
Swarna Malsyam (1975)
Tourist Bunglow (1975)
Sammanam  (1975)
Kamam Krodham Moham  (1975)
Nellu (1974) as Mala
Adimakkachavadam (1974) 
Rajahamsam (1974) 
Bhoomidevi Pushpiniyayi (1974) as Indu
Ayalathe Sundari (1974) as Sreedevi
Arakkallan Mukkalkkallan (1974) as Mangamma Rani
Pancha Thanthram (1974) as Sindhu/Rajkumari Sathi
Neelakannukal (1974) 
Sethubandanam  (1974)
Chandrakandam  (1974)
Poonthenaruvi  (1974) as Rosily
Manyasree Vishwamithran  (1974) as Padmam
Thacholi Marumakan Chandu  (1974) as Thekkumadom Maathu
Neelakannukal  (1974)
Night Duty  (1974) as Vimala
Swarnavigraham  (1974)
Rahsyarathri  (1974)
Pathiravum Pakalvelichavum  (1974)
Azhakulla Saleena (1973) as Selena
Jesus (1973) as Veronica
Kalachakram (1973) as Radha
Urvashi Bharathi (1973)
Ladies Hostel (1973) as Lalli
Nakhangal (1973) as Gomathi
Thottavadi  (1973) as Savithri
Manassu  (1973)
Yamini  (1973) as Indira
Interview  (1973) as Susheela
Masappadi Maathupilla  (1973)
Kaliyugam  (1973)
Madhavikutty  (1973)
Soundarya Pooja  (1973)
Thiruvabharanam (1973)
Enippadikal  (1973)
Manushyaputhran  (1973) as Madhavi
Divya Darshanam(1973) as Indira
Maram (1973) as Aamina
Poymukhangal  (1973)
Gayathry (1973)
Aaradhika  (1973) as Hema 
Sasthram Jayichu Manushyan Thottu  (1973) as Sulochana
Punarjanmam (1972) as Radha, Aravindan's mother (double role)
Oru Sundariyude Katha (1972) as Sundari
Manushyabandhagal  (1972)
Lakshyam  (1972)
Mappusakshi  (1972)
Mayiladumkunnu  (1972)
Akkarapacha  (1972)
Adyathe Kadha  (1972)
Ananthasayanam  (1972)
Iniyoru Janmam Tharoo  (1972)
Prathikaram (1972) as Shobha
Azhimukam  (1972)
Nrithashala  (1972) as Priyamvadha
Thottilla  (1972)
Sathi  (1972)
Aradi Manninte Janmi  (1972) as Sumathi
C.I.D. Nazir (1971) as Shanthi
Vidhyarthigale Ithile Ithile (1972)
Karakanakadal (1971) as Marykutty 
Linebus (1971) as Sarasamma 
Achanum Bappyum (1971) as Sainaba, Amina (double role)
Kochaniyathi  (1971) as Indu
Avalalppam Vaikippoyi  (1971)
Kalithozhi  (1971)
Inquilab Sindabad  (1971) as Vasanthi
Moonnu Pookkal  (1971)
Sindooracheppu  (1971) as Ammalu
Sarasayya  (1971) as Sarala
Puthenveedu  (1971)
Manpeda  (1971)
Kuttyedathi (1971) as Jaanu
Gangasangamam  (1971)
Oru Penninte Kadha  (1971) as Thankamma
Vilakku Vangiya Veena  (1971) as Sunanda
Vivahitha  (1970) as Sukumari 
Thurakkatha Vathil  (1970) as Nabeesa
Palunku Pathram  (1970)
Anadha  (1970)
Thara  (1970) as Usha
 Nilakkatha Chalanagal (1970)
Detective 909 Keralathil  (1970)
 Ningalenne Communistakki (1970) as Maala
Ammeyenna Sthree  (1970)
Dathuputhran  (1970) as Annakutty
Priya  (1970)
Madhuvidhu  (1970) as Malini
Kakkathamburatti  (1970)
Sthree  (1970)
Kurukshethram  (1970)
Kadalpalam (1969) as Geetha
Rahasyam  (1969) as Sulochana
Kattukurangu  (1969)
Sandhya (1969)
Nurse  (1969)
Virunnukari  (1969) as Shantha
Mooladhanam(1969) as Nabeesu
Veettumrigam  (1969)
Urangatha Sundari  (1969) as Madhumathi
Ballatha Pahayan  (1969) as Salma
Thokkukal Katha Parayunnu (1968)
Anaachaadhanam (1968)
Viruthan Shanku  (1968) as Kamakshi
Kayalkkarayil  (1968)
Vidhyarthi  (1968)
Padunna Puzha (1968) as Sharada
Anju Sundarikal  (1968)
Velutha Kathreena  (1968) as Rosa
Kaliyalla Kalyanam  (1968)
Naadanpennu (1967) as Sainabha 
Khadeeja (1967)
Kaanatha Veshangal (1967)
Penmakkal (1966)

Tamil

Chinnanchiru Ulagam (1966)
Parakkum Paavai (1966)
Anubavi Raja Anubavi (1967) as Ramamani 
Pesum Dheivam (1967)
Raja Veetu Pillai (1967)
Suba Dhinam (1969)
Thalaivan (1970)
Namma Veettu Deivam (1970)
Dharisanam (1970)
Enna Muthalali Sowkiyama (1972)
Pudhiya Vazhkai (1971)
Naan Avanillai (1974)
Kaadhal Vedham (1978)Alavudinum Arbutha Vilakkum (1979) as RoshniPasi (1979)Saranam Ayyappa (1980)Mohana Punnagai (1981)Varusham Padhinaaru (1989)Michael Madana Kama Rajan (1990)Thangathin Thangam (1990)Sirayil Pootha Chinna Malar (1990)Madurai Veeran Enga Saami (1990)Marupakkam (1990) as JanakiMoondrezhuthil En Moochirukkum (1991) as MaryAnnai Vayal (1992) Muthal Kural (1992)Ungal Anbu Thangachi(1994)Muthu (1995)Aavathum Pennale Azhivathum Pennale (1996)Aasai Thambi (1998)Dhill (2001)

TeluguLakshmi (2006)

HindiNagin Aur Lootere (1992) (as Jaya Bharti) as RajniPratishodh (1980) (as Jay Bharti)

Television careerPeythozhiyathe (Surya TV)Kottaipurathu Veedu (DD Podhigai)Nimmathi Ungal Choice''

References

External links

 

Actresses from Tamil Nadu
20th-century Indian actresses
Kerala State Film Award winners
Filmfare Awards South winners
Actresses in Tamil cinema
Indian film actresses
People from Erode district
Actresses in Malayalam cinema
21st-century Indian actresses
Living people
Actresses in Telugu cinema
Actresses in Hindi cinema
Special Jury Award (feature film) National Film Award winners
Actresses in Tamil television
Actresses in Malayalam television
1954 births